Rasshua,  is an uninhabited volcanic island near the center of the Kuril Islands chain in the Sea of Okhotsk in the northwest Pacific Ocean,  from Ushishir and  southwest of Matua. Its name is derived from the Ainu language for “fur coat”.

Geology
The island is a complex stratovolcano with three overlapping central cones within a 6 kilometer caldera whose eastern margin is beyond the shoreline. The island has five small fresh water lakes, and numerous hot springs.

The peak has not erupted in historic times, although it emits quantities of volcanic gas and its sides are streaked with sulfur deposits.

The only other known historical eruption produced weak explosions in 1957. Active fulmaroles are found in the eastern crater and in the saddle between the two summit cones. It had a mild eruption on February 6, 2013.

Major features
 Ozero Beloye (lake)
 Ozero Tikhoye (lake)
 Maul (mountain)
 Rasshua (volcano)
 Serp (mountain)

History
Rasshua was inhabited by the Ainu, at the time of European contact, and the remains of over 40 dwellings have been discovered. The island appears on an official map showing the territories of Matsumae Domain, a feudal domain of Edo period Japan dated 1644, and these holdings were officially confirmed by the Tokugawa shogunate in 1715.  Subsequently, claimed by the Empire of Russia, sovereignty initially passed to Russia under the terms of the Treaty of Shimoda, but was returned to the Empire of Japan per the Treaty of Saint Petersburg along with the rest of the Kuril islands. At this time, the remaining Ainu inhabitants (eight families) were forcibly relocated to Shikotan, and the island became uninhabited. The island was formerly administered as part of Shimushiru District of Nemuro Subprefecture of Hokkaidō.

After World War II, the island came under the control of the Soviet Union, and is now administered as part of the Sakhalin Oblast of the Russian Federation.

See also
List of volcanoes in Russia

Further reading 
 Gorshkov, G. S. Volcanism and the Upper Mantle Investigations in the Kurile Island Arc. Monographs in geoscience. New York: Plenum Press, 1970. 
 Krasheninnikov, Stepan Petrovich, and James Greive. The History of Kamtschatka and the Kurilski Islands, with the Countries Adjacent. Chicago: Quadrangle Books, 1963. 
 Rees, David. The Soviet Seizure of the Kuriles. New York: Praeger, 1985.  
 Takahashi, Hideki, and Masahiro Ōhara. Biodiversity and Biogeography of the Kuril Islands and Sakhalin. Bulletin of the Hokkaido University Museum, no. 2-. Sapporo, Japan: Hokkaido University Museum, 2004.

Notes

References

External links

  — Oceandots.

Islands of the Kuril Islands
Active volcanoes
Islands of the Sea of Okhotsk
Islands of the Russian Far East
Stratovolcanoes of Russia
Uninhabited islands of Russia
Calderas of Russia
Volcanoes of the Kuril Islands
Mountains of the Kuril Islands